Ryan Robbins (born 7 April 1988) is a Saint Kitts and Nevis footballer who plays as a forward.

Early life

Growing up, Robbins supported Manchester United and idolized Wales international Ryan Giggs.

Club career

In 2010, he signed for Coalville Town. In total, Robbins received four red cards and thirty yellow cards Coalville Town. He helped Coalville Town reach the 2011 FA Vase final and achieve promotion to the Evo-Stik Northern Premier League. During 2012/13, he made forty-eight appearances and scored thirty-four goals.

In 2013, he signed for King's Lynn Town. The move divided fans due to his previous online Twitter arguments with King's Lynn Town supporters while playing for rivals Coalville Town.  However, he left due to constant online abuse from King's Lynn Town supporters. After that, Robbins signed for Barwell.

In 2013, he signed for Stamford. He was their top scorer during the 2013/14 and 2014/15 seasons. During 2014/15, Robbins scored during a 3-2 win over Witton Albion to help Stamford avoid relegation on the final day of the season. He finished 2014/15 with twenty-four goals in all competitions. He also helped them win the Lincolnshire Trophy.  In 2015, he left Stamford.

In 2015, Robbins signed for Boston United. In total, he made fifteen appearances for Boston United. After that, he returned to Stamford. In November 2016, he left Stamford. In 2016, he returned to Coalville Town. In 2017, he returned to Barwell. After that, he signed for AFC Rushden & Diamonds. Robbins scored a hat-trick for AFC Rushden & Diamonds during a 3-1 win over Kempston Rovers.

In 2018, he signed for Loughborough Dynamo, where he was the third-highest NPL East Division top scorer during 2018/19, before leaving in 2019. On 20 November 2019, Robbins returned to Corby Town from Leicester Nirvana. He had previously spent time on loan at Corby Town for three months in 2016, whilst on loan from Boston United. In 2020, he signed for St Neot's Town. In 2021, he signed for Melton Town. He debuted for Melton Town during a 1-4 loss to Aylestone Park. In total, he made fifteen appearances and scored six goals for Melton Town before departing.

International career

Robbins qualified to represent the Saint Kitts and Nevis national football team through his grandparents. He debuted for Saint Kitts and Nevis during a 6-2 win over the Turks and Caicos Islands national football team. He scored his first goal for Saint Kitts and Nevis during a 6-2 win over the Turks and Caicos Islands national football team.

Style of play

Robbins is left-footed and is known for his speed and physicality.

Personal life

Robbins has a son. He is the cousin of Saint Kitts and Nevis international Harry Panayiotou.

Career staistics

|-
| 1. || 26 March 2015 || TCIFA National Academy, Providenciales ||  ||  ||  || 2018 FIFA World Cup qualification || 
|}

References

External links

1988 births
Living people
Citizens of Saint Kitts and Nevis through descent
Saint Kitts and Nevis footballers
Association football forwards
Saint Kitts and Nevis international footballers
English footballers
Coalville Town F.C. players
Barwell F.C. players
King's Lynn Town F.C. players
Stamford A.F.C. players
Boston United F.C. players
Corby Town F.C. players
Gresley F.C. players
AFC Rushden & Diamonds players
Loughborough Dynamo F.C. players
Leicester Nirvana F.C. players
English sportspeople of Saint Kitts and Nevis descent